FC Kaluga is an association football club from Kaluga, Russia, founded in 2009. The club is playing in the FNL 2. The team appeared after uniting two football Clubs from Kaluga: FC MiK Kaluga and FC Lokomotiv Kaluga. The two teams finished 1st and 2d in Russian Amateur Football League Chernozemic Zone championship in 2009 and Kaluga faced the opportunity to promote a football club that could represent the City to Russian Professional Football League so the two teams were united.

Current squad
As of 21 February 2023, according to the Second League website.

References

External links
Official website
Profile on 2liga.ru
Facebook page

Association football clubs established in 2009
Football clubs in Russia
Sport in Kaluga
2009 establishments in Russia